Elminiidae is a family of symmetrical sessile barnacles in the order Balanomorpha. There are about 5 genera and 12 described species in Elminiidae.

Genera
These genera belong to the family Elminiidae:
 Austrominius Buckeridge, 1983
 Elminius Leach, 1825
 Hexaminius Foster, 1982
 Protelminius Buckeridge & Newman, 2010
 † Matellonius Buckeridge, 1983

References

Barnacles